Calocea is a monotypic moth genus of the family Noctuidae. Its only species, Calocea eucraspedica, is found in Mexico. Both the genus and species were first described by Harrison Gray Dyar Jr. in 1914.

References

Cuculliinae
Monotypic moth genera